Norges Statsbaner (NSB) operates as of January 1, 2008 36 locomotives, 191 multiple units and 206 passenger carriages.

Current stock

Locomotives

 
2 Di 2 class diesel shunters
5 Di 4 class diesel locomotives, used mostly on the Nordland Line.
9 El 17 class electric locomotives, three used for shunting and a further six are run on the Flåm Line.
22 El 18 class electric locomotives, used on all main electrified lines.

Electric multiple units

80 Class 69 class 2-car or 3-car commuter trains, used around Oslo, Bergen and Arendal.
16 Class 70 class 4-car intercity (medium distance) trains, used around Oslo.
36 Class 72 class 4-car commuter trains, used around Oslo and Stavanger.
16 Class 73 class 4-car long-distance trains, used on Bergen Line, Dovre Line and Sørland Line.
6 Class 73b class 4-car intercity version of the BM73 used on Østfold Line.

Diesel multiple units

14 Class 92 class 2-car trains used for commuter services around Trondheim, and on the Røros Line.
15 Class 93 class 2-car trains used on long distance and intercity services on Rørosbanen, Nordland Line and Rauma Line.

Diesel railcar

2 Y1 used on Bratsberg Line between Skien and Notodden.

Numbering
The first letter combination of the type defines the category of stock.
 El: Electric locomotive
 Di: Diesel locomotive
 Skd: Shunter tractor
 BM: Multiple unit

The numbers following the letters are the series. For the El and Di locos, they are numbered chronologically from when they were ordered by NSB. For multiple units, electric units are numbered starting with 62 and diesel starting at 83. Following the series number is the road number, unique for each stock. This number has three or four digits.

Livery
Traditionally NSBs electric and diesel locomotives and carriages were painted green, but in the 1970s this was replaced with red. Shunters were given a yellow color with red cabs. During the late 1990s and 2000s a new color scheme was introduced with multiple colors. Express trains were painted blue and silver, regional trains red and silver while local trains became green and silver. The freight trains were moved to the subsidiary CargoNet and painted grey, the Airport Express Train was painted silver and while the tourist railway Flåmsbana got green trains.

Locomotives

(*) Does not show locomotive in NSB livery.

Multiple units

Norwegian State Railways
Rolling stock of Norway
Norwegian State Railways locomotives
Multiple units by railway company